Sheykh Hoseyn (also Romanized as Sheykh Ḩoseyn; also known as Abū ‘Az̄ām, Abū ‘Az̧ām, and Sheykh Ḩoseynī) is a village in Shoaybiyeh-ye Gharbi Rural District, Shadravan District, Shushtar County, Khuzestan Province, Iran. At the 2006 census, its population was 960, in 160 families.

References 

Populated places in Shushtar County